Naprawa  is a village in the administrative district of Gmina Jordanów, within Sucha County, Lesser Poland Voivodeship, in southern Poland.

The village has an approximate population of 2,100.

References

Naprawa